Baorisa hieroglyphica, also known as the Picasso moth, is a species of moth in the family Erebidae. It was described by the British entomologist Frederic Moore in 1882. The genus Baorisa was long thought to be monotypic, but three other species have been described. It is found in parts of northeastern India and Southeast Asia.

References

Revision of the genus Baorisa

Calpinae
Moths described in 1882